A refrigerator magnet or fridge magnet is a small magnet, often attached to an artistic or whimsical ornament, which may be used to post items such as shopping lists, Christmas cards, child art or reminders on a refrigerator door, or which simply serves as decoration. Refrigerator magnets come in a wide variety of shapes and sizes, and may have promotional messages placed on them.  In addition to refrigerators, fridge magnets are commonly placed on steel-backed whiteboards and bulletin boards, as well as other metal furniture such as filing cabinets and tool chests. Refrigerator magnets are popular souvenir and collectible objects.

Manufacture

The first fridge magnets were cylindrical or solid rectangular magnets. Later, a flexible magnet was developed, composed of a high-coercivity ferrimagnetic or ferromagnetic compound (usually barium ferrite) mixed with a plastic binder.  This is extruded as a sheet and passes on a conveyor belt over a line of powerful cylindrical permanent magnets. These magnets are arranged in a stack with alternating magnetic poles facing up (N, S, N, S,...) on a freely rotating shaft. This impresses the plastic sheet with the magnetic poles in an alternating line format. No electromagnetism is used to generate the magnets. The pole-pole distance is on the order of 5 mm, but varies with manufacturer. Ferrite magnets are commonly used, too, with decorative elements attached to the magnets with adhesive. They were created in the 1920s.

Magnetic polarization

Unlike most conventional magnets that have distinct north and south poles, flat refrigerator magnets are magnetized during manufacture with alternating north and south poles on the refrigerator side. This can be felt by taking two similar (or identical) refrigerator magnets and sliding them against each other with the "magnetic" sides facing each other: the magnets will alternately repel and attract as they are moved a few millimeters. One can note that magnetic field outside a uniformly magnetized thin sheet is actually zero, neglecting the edge effects (see, for instance, D. Budker and A. Sushkov, Physics in Your Feet", OUP, 2015). Most magnets have a special, slightly more sophisticated magnetization pattern called a Halbach array.  This construction gives enhanced magnetic field on one side and almost zero magnetic field on the other.

Applications 

Fridge magnets may be designed to decorate refrigerators. Refrigerator magnets are also widely given away as promotional products. Refrigerator magnets can be made from rubber, PVC, polyresin, metal, porcelain, epoxy, or a mixture of some of these materials. A business can put their logo on the magnets for marketing purposes. 

Refrigerator magnets can also be souvenirs. Many souvenir shops throughout the world sell magnets with local charms printed.

Collecting
Collecting magnets is a hobby, with some collectors specializing in magnets from their travels, or of a particular theme. They are sold at souvenir shops worldwide. There is no generally recognized term (e.g. numismatics for currency collecting) for magnet collecting. A Russian collector has proposed the term memomagnetics (Russian: мемомагнетика), derived from the words memoriale (Latin) and magnetis (Greek) A collector of magnets would be called memomagnetist. These terms have been used by at least one Russian online community for magnet collectors.

According to Collector's Lot magazine, in March 1999, Tony Lloyd of Cardiff, Wales, coined the term "thuramgist" for a "collector of fridge magnets".. Another word is Ferrovenirist, a portmanteau of the Latin for magnet and souvenir.

Large collections

At one time, the largest verified collection of refrigerator magnets belonged to Louise J. Greenfarb from Henderson, Nevada (suburb of Las Vegas, United States). Her world record was included to the Guinness World Records with 19,300 items as of 1997. According to the British "Book of alternative records", it grew to 29,000 as of February 2002, and later up to over 30,000 items. Over 7,000 magnets from Greenfarb's collection were exhibited at the Guinness Museum in Las Vegas, which has since closed.  According to her son, Bryan Greenfarb, as of November 2015 Louise still collects and has around 45,000 plus non-duplicate refrigerator magnets but the Guinness verification process, which can take over 6 plus months, is just too taxing to keep validating the exact number.  Louise Greenfarb died December 7, 2019.  Her son Bryan Greenfarb is in possession of her over 65,000 non-duplicate refrigerator magnets.

In January 1999, Tony Lloyd, a teacher in Cardiff, Wales, was interviewed by the Channel 4 Television programme Collector's Lot when it was ascertained that he had largest collection of fridge magnets in Europe at that time, over 2000. As of January 2016 he had a collection of over 4500. He was again interviewed by the BBC and ITV during 2017. In February 2018, whilst on holiday in Sri Lanka, his 104th country, Tony's collection surpassed 5,000 magnets.

Home crafts
Refrigerator magnets are also popular as crafts projects.

References

Decorative arts
Ephemera
Joining
Types of magnets
Magnets